XHFMTU-FM is a radio station in Monterrey, Nuevo León. Broadcasting on 103.7 FM, XHFMTU is owned by Multimedios Radio and carries a Top 40 format known as FMTU.

XHFMTU-FM broadcasts in HD and is authorized to carry three subchannels:
HD1 is a simulcast of the analog (traditional) signal.
HD2 is a simulcast of XEAW-AM 1280.
HD3 is Milenio Radio.

History

The concession history for XHFMTU begins with the award of XHNL-FM to Alfonso Flores López on August 23, 1979. At that time, the station broadcast on 94.9 MHz. In 1988, XHNL became XHITS-FM (the current callsign of 106.1), and in 1999 came another callsign change to XHFMTU-FM and the adoption of the station name FM TU (You FM).

When the Milenio Radio format of news programs with English classic hits music was brought to Monterrey on XHFMTU in 2012, the FM Tú format went online-only. Milenio Radio itself was nearly completely wound down in early 2018, with XHFMTU being the last station to exit the format by way of the relaunch of FM Tú as an urban station on April 1, 2018. Milenio Radio was transitioned to the HD3 subchannel.

XERG-AM 690 was on the HD3 subchannel until Multimedios was authorized to replace it with XENL-AM 860 on August 21, 2019. By that time, XHERG-FM 92.9 was operating.

References

Radio stations in Nuevo León
Multimedios Radio